Dezong may refer to:

Temple name
Emperor Dezong of Tang (742–805)
Yelü Dashi (died 1143), emperor of Kara Khitai (Western Liao)
Guangxu Emperor (1871–1908) of the Qing dynasty

Given name
Emperor An of Jin (397–419), personal name Sima Dezong

Temple name disambiguation pages